Doug Swail (born c. 1930) was a Canadian football player who played for the Edmonton Eskimos. He previously played junior football in Edmonton.

References

1930s births
Canadian football running backs
Edmonton Elks players
Living people